Dorian Jamaal "D. J." Killings (born August 9, 1995) is a gridiron football cornerback for the Calgary Stampeders of the Canadian Football League (CFL). He played college football at UCF, and signed as an undrafted free agent with the New England Patriots in 2017.

Professional career

Killings was seen as a high value undrafted free agent prospect immediately after the draft, and fielded calls from several teams.

New England Patriots
Killings signed with the New England Patriots as an undrafted free agent on May 5, 2017. He was waived/injured by the Patriots on September 2, 2017 and placed on injured reserve. He was released with an injury settlement on September 13, 2017.

Philadelphia Eagles
On October 3, 2017, Killings was signed to the Philadelphia Eagles practice squad. Killings stayed on the Eagles' practice squad while the team defeated the New England Patriots in Super Bowl LII. He signed a reserve/future contract with the Eagles on February 7, 2018.

On September 1, 2018, Killings was waived/injured by the Eagles and was placed on injured reserve. He was released on September 6, 2018.

Indianapolis Colts
On October 16, 2018, Killings was signed to the Indianapolis Colts practice squad. He was promoted to the active roster on November 13, 2018. He was placed on injured reserve on November 20, 2018 with an ankle injury. He was released on December 10, 2018.

Green Bay Packers
On December 18, 2018, Killings was signed to the Green Bay Packers practice squad.

Indianapolis Colts (second stint)
On January 14, 2019, Killings signed a reserve/future contract with the Indianapolis Colts. He was waived on May 17, 2019.

Oakland Raiders
On May 30, 2019, Killings was signed by the Oakland Raiders. He was placed on injured reserve on August 11, 2019.

Killings was re-signed to a one-year contract on April 16, 2020. He chose to opt-out of the 2020 season due to the COVID-19 pandemic on August 3, 2020. He was released after the season on March 1, 2021.

Calgary Stampeders
Killings was signed to the Calgary Stampeders on May 17, 2021.

References

External links
UCF Knights bio
New England Patriots bio

1995 births
Living people
Players of American football from Miami
First Coast High School alumni
American football cornerbacks
UCF Knights football players
New England Patriots players
Philadelphia Eagles players
Indianapolis Colts players
Green Bay Packers players
Oakland Raiders players
Las Vegas Raiders players
Calgary Stampeders players
Players of Canadian football from Miami